Vallunaraju or Wallunaraju (possibly from Ancash Quechua  to cut, wallu earless, someone whose ears are amputated -na a nominalising suffix, Quechua rahu snow, ice, mountain with snow,) is a mountain in the Cordillera Blanca in the Andes of Peru, about  high and located in Huaraz Province, Ancash. Vallunaraju lies south west of Ranrapalca and Ocshapalca.

Images

References

Mountains of Peru
Mountains of Ancash Region